Beverley Ruth Dunn (24 April 1933 – 27 November 2021) was an Australian veteran radio, stage, television and film actress based in Melbourne, Australia.

Dunn had roles in films including Ground Zero, Gross Misconduct,  Shine (1996), The Craic (1999), The Dish (2000) and Charlie and Boots (2009).

She appeared in numerous television series for which she was best known including Bellbird and The Flying Doctors as Claire Byrant.

Other TV credits : Productions for both Crawford Productions and Grundy Television including  Homicide, Matlock Police, Division 4, Prisoner (4 different character roles), Carson's Law, Neighbours (as Tina Bentley), A Country Practice and All Saints.

She appeared in Roundabout, the first live play produced for Melbourne television (broadcast on 4 January 1957).

Dunn featured in hundreds of radio plays and book readings  for both the ABC and the BBC in England.

Her lengthy stage career dating from  1952 until 2008, included roles for state and local companies, including for the Melbourne Theatre Company, Playbox Theatre, HIT Productions, South Australian Theatre Company, St Martins Theatre, Alexander Theatre. Melbourne Little Theatre and Tin Alley Players, as well as her one woman play As We Are that several times toured nationally.

Dunn died in Melbourne, Australia on 27 November 2021, at the age of 88.

Filmography

References

External links
 

1933 births
2021 deaths
20th-century Australian actresses
21st-century Australian actresses
Australian film actresses
Australian soap opera actresses
Actresses from Melbourne
People educated at Firbank Girls' Grammar School